Novy Toryal (U Torjal) is an urban locality (an urban-type settlement) and the administrative center of Novotoryalsky District of the Mari El Republic, Russia. As of the 2010 Census, its population was 6,635.

Administrative and municipal status
Within the framework of administrative divisions, Novy Toryal serves as the administrative center of Novotoryalsky District. As an administrative division, the urban-type settlement of Novy Toryal, together with one rural locality (the village of Petrichata), is incorporated within Novotoryalsky District as Novy Toryal Urban-Type Settlement (an administrative division of the district). As a municipal division, Novy Toryal Urban-Type Settlement is incorporated within Novotoryalsky Municipal District as Novy Toryal Urban Settlement.

References

Notes

Sources

Urban-type settlements in the Mari El Republic
Urzhumsky Uyezd
